Margarita Nazarova (born March 23, 1976) is a retired female race walker from Russia. She set her personal best (1:28:24) in the women's 20 km road race walk on May 25, 2002 in Cheboksary.  While she only finished sixth in that race, the time ranked her number 7 in the world for that year.

References

External links

1976 births
Living people
Russian female racewalkers
21st-century Russian women